is a subway station on the Toei Shinjuku Line in Shinjuku, Tokyo, Japan, operated by Toei Subway. Its station number is S-03.

Lines
Akebonobashi Station is served by the Toei Shinjuku Line.

Platforms
Akebonobashi Station consists of two side platforms.

History
The station opened on March 16, 1980.

Surrounding area

The station lies beneath Akebonobashi, a bridge at the intersection of Tokyo Metropolitan Route 319 (Gaien-Higashi-dōri) and Metropolitan Route 302 (Yasukuni-dōri). The former headquarters of Fuji Television were located nearby, but have since been redeveloped into a high-rise apartment complex named Kawadacho Confo Garden.
Other points of interest include:
 Ministry of Defense
 Chuo University, Ichigaya Campus
Tokyo Women's Medical University and Hospital
 Akebonobashi-dōri shopping street (The former name was Fuji Television street)
 Yotsuya-sanchōme Station (Tokyo Metro Marunouchi Line) (8 minutes walk south)
 Ushigome-yanagichō Station (Toei Ōedo Line) (10 minutes walk north)

Connecting bus services
Stop: Akebonobashi
 Shiro 61 for Shinjuku Station (west exit), Nerima Garage
Stop: Arakichō
 Sō 81 for Sōdai-seimon (Waseda University), Shibuya Station (east exit)
Stop: Kappazaka-shita
 Taka 71 for Kudanshita Station, Takadanobaba Station (via Ōkubo-dōri)
 Shuku 75 for Shinjuku Station (west exit), Miyakezaka (via Tokyo Women's Medical University)

References

External links

 Tokyo Metropolitan Bureau of Transportation: Akebonobashi Station 

Railway stations in Japan opened in 1980
Railway stations in Tokyo